Remiz is a genus of birds in the family Remizidae, commonly known as the Eurasian pendulines (in contrast to the African pendulines). Like other penduline tits, they are named for their elegant, pendulous nests.

Taxonomy 
The genus Remiz was introduced in 1819 by the Polish zoologist Feliks Paweł Jarocki to accommodate a single species, the Eurasian penduline tit. The name Remiz is the Polish word for the Eurasian penduline tit.

The genus contains the following four species:

References 

 
Bird genera
Taxa named by Feliks Paweł Jarocki
Taxonomy articles created by Polbot